The Battleford Industrial School was a Canadian Indian residential school for First Nations children in Battleford, Northwest Territories (now Saskatchewan) from 1883-1914. It was the first residential school operated by the Government of Canada with the aim of assimilating Indigenous people into the society of the settlers.

The school was one of three industrial schools opened by the Government of Canada in the early 1880s. The senior officials of the Department of Indian Affairs arranged for various religious denominations to administer and operate the schools. The federal government delegated responsibility for the Battleford school to an Anglican minister.

History

The Battleford Industrial School opened December 1, 1883. 
Thomas Clarke served as the first principal.  The school opened at Old Government House. Built in 1876, the building had been the seat of the Territorial Capital of the North-West Territories from 1878 to 1883, at which time the capital was relocated to Regina, District of Assiniboia. 
The Truth and Reconciliation Commission of Canada (TRC) stated that the school "marked a turning point in Canada's direct involvement in residential schooling for Aboriginal people." Within a year of the Battleford school opening, two other government-funded schools, the High River Industrial School and Qu'Appelle Industrial School, had begun operations.

The TRC linked the creation of the Battleford, High River and Qu'Appelle schools to a 1879 report authored by Nicholas Flood Davin. Now known as the Davin Report, the Report on Industrial Schools for Indians and Half-Breeds was submitted to Ottawa on March 14, 1879, and made the case for a cooperative approach between the Canadian government and the church to implement the "aggressive assimilation" pursued by President of the United States, Ulysses S. Grant. Prior to the opening of the school the government's involvement with residential schools had been limited to providing grants to boarding schools operated by churches. 

Staff and students abandoned the school during the North-West Rebellion of 1885, and the building was used for a time as barracks by the military. Indigenous people damaged the interior of the school in the Looting of Battleford during the rebellion. Later that year on November 27 the students were taken to Fort Battleford to witness the hanging of eight Indigenous men convicted of murder during the uprising. Most of the students were from the Ahtahkakoop, Mistawasis, and John Smith reserves.

The school had less than 30 students when it first opened. They were taught trades related to agriculture, carpentry, and blacksmithing. Academic courses were reading, writing, and English. The school grew to over 100 students by the early 1900s. A girl's wing was added to the school. Students typically spent half of the day in standard school classes and the other half of the day engaged in some form of manual labour. For the girls, this included baking, laundry, and cleaning. For the boys, they would be involved in blacksmithing, carpentry, shoemaking, printing, and farming under the tutelage of dedicated instructors and hired teachers. 

A new east wing was added in 1889.

School closure

By 1912 attendance at the school had dropped to 35 students and Duncan Campbell Scott, superintendent of Indian Education at the Department of Indian Affairs, believed that the school was no longer useful. The school had the capacity to accommodate 150 students. It was officially closed two years later on May 31, 1914. After its closure, many Indigenous children from around the Battlefords were sent to different schools in Saskatchewan, including Thunderchild Residential School at Delmas.

The building then became the Seventh-day Adventist Battleford Academy from 1916 to 1931 with enrolments of between 114 and 160 students.

From 1932 to 1972 it was the Oblate House of Studies and the St. Charles Scholasticate (seminary) which closed in 1972. The Oblates left the building in 1984. Old Government House was designated a national historic site of Canada in 1973. The building was destroyed by fire in 2003.

Cemetery
The Battleford Industrial School has a cemetery located seven-hundred metres due south of the site of the school. A 1974 excavation of the site revealed that seventy-two people were buried in the cemetery. The Battleford Industrial School Cemetery was marked with a cairn, chain fences, and numbered grave markers on August 31, 1975. The Battleford Industrial School cemetery was noted at page 119 in Volume 4 of the Truth and Reconciliation Commission of Canada final reports: 

In 2019 the cemetery was designated Provincial Heritage Property by the Government of Saskatchewan.

Notable alumni
Alex Decoteau was born at Red Pheasant First Nation near the Battlefords. He became a student at the Battleford Industrial School following his father's death in 1891. He was an Olympic athlete and the first Indigenous police officer in Canada, joining the Edmonton Police Service in 1911. He died serving in World War I in 1917. Edmonton has named a park and neighbourhood after Decoteau.

See also
 Canadian Indian residential school system
 List of residential schools in Canada

References

External links
Residential Schools: Photographic Collections - Saskatchewan
Aboriginal Documentary Heritage (Examples of students handwriting

Residential schools in Saskatchewan
Defunct schools in Canada
Educational institutions established in 1883
Educational institutions disestablished in 1914